is a passenger railway station in the town of Minakami, Gunma, Japan, operated by the East Japan Railway Company (JR East).

Lines

Station layout
The station is unusual in that it has two single side platforms, one of which is elevated, and the other is located underground within the Shin-Shimizu Tunnel. The station is unattended.

Platforms

History
Yubiso Station opened on 1 September 1931. Upon the privatization of the Japanese National Railways (JNR) on 1 April 1987, it came under the control of JR East. A new station building was completed in January 2010.

Surrounding area
Yubiso Post Office

See also
 List of railway stations in Japan

External links

 Station information (JR East) 

Railway stations in Gunma Prefecture
Railway stations in Japan opened in 1931
Stations of East Japan Railway Company
Jōetsu Line
Minakami, Gunma